is a mountain in the city of Kashihara, in the central-western part Nara Prefecture, Japan. Together with Mount Unebi and Mount Miminashi, it belongs to the so-called "Yamato Sanzan". It is at the end of Ryumon Mountains that continues from Mount Tatake in comparison to the other two mountains being a sole peak.

References

External links

Mountains of Nara Prefecture
Mountains under 1000 metres